Chhab (Urdu : چھب) is a village situated in Jand Tehsil of Attock District in Punjab Province of Pakistan.

It is located near Makhad Sharif along the bank of  River Sindh. Chhab is the headquarters of "Chhab Union Council" and governed the neighboring villages. Punjabi Khatris have Chhabra surname from this region, after 1947 Chhabra settled like other NWFP refugees in and around Delhi.

References

Villages in Attock District